The Kot Addu Power Company (KAPCO) is a Pakistani power company owns, operates, and maintains a multi-fuel fired power plant in Kot Addu District, Punjab, Pakistan.

It has a nameplate capacity of 1,600 MW.

History 
Incorporated in 1996, the Kot Addu Power Plant was built by the Pakistan Water and Power Development Authority (WAPDA). In April 2000, the company was incorporated as a public limited company.

In 2005, the company was formally listed on the stock exchanges of Pakistan.

See also 
 List of power stations in Pakistan

References

External links 
 Kot Addu Power Company Limited

Electric power companies of Pakistan
Companies listed on the Pakistan Stock Exchange
Pakistani companies established in 1996
Energy companies established in 1996
Kot Addu District
Water and Power Development Authority
Formerly government-owned companies of Pakistan
2005 initial public offerings